3SH is a commercial radio station in Swan Hill, Victoria, Australia broadcasting on the medium wave band on a frequency of 1332kHz. It was opened on 27 August 1931.

It is owned by Ace Radio.

References

External links

Radio stations in Victoria
Radio stations established in 1931
Classic hits radio stations in Australia
Ace Radio
Swan Hill